Tadeusz Żakiej (13 January 1915 – 6 October 1994) was a Polish musicologist and music publicist, as well as a food writer. He used the pen name Tadeusz Marek when writing about music and the double pen name Maria Lemnis and Henryk Vitry for his work on culinary topics.

Polish musicologists
Polish food writers
1915 births
1994 deaths
20th-century musicologists